"Get Home" is a song by American recording artist JR Castro. It was released on July 31, 2015, as the first single from his second EP, Sexpectations, Vol.1 (2017). The track, produced by DJ Mustard, features guest appearances from American rappers Kid Ink and Quavo of Migos.

Music video
The official music video for "Get Home" premiered on October 9, 2015, on Castro's VEVO channel.

Track listing
Digital download
"Get Home"  (Explicit) – 4:00
"Get Home"  (Clean) – 4:00

Charts

References

External links

2015 songs
2015 singles
Kid Ink songs
Song recordings produced by Mustard (record producer)
Songs written by Poo Bear
Songs written by Sean Combs
Songs written by Faith Evans
Songs written by James Giannos
Songs written by Dominic Jordan
Songs written by Mustard (record producer)
Songs written by Kid Ink
Quavo songs
Songs written by Quavo